Cirsium ciliolatum is a species of thistle known by the common name Ashland thistle. It is endemic to the Klamath Mountains, where it is known from only a few occurrences in Jackson and Josephine Counties in Oregon, as well as neighboring Humboldt and Siskiyou Counties in California. It is related to Cirsium undulatum and may be more accurately described as a variety of that species.

Cirsium ciliolatum  is a perennial herb growing from a rootstock branching with runner roots to a maximum height near . It is cobwebby with fibers. The gray-green woolly leaves are smooth along the edges to deeply lobed, sometimes spiny and cobwebby, and up to 25 centimeters at the longest. The inflorescence is a cluster of several flower heads each about 2 centimeters long and up to 5 wide. The head is lined with sticky, spiny phyllaries and packed with white to lavender flowers. The fruit is an achene with a thick body a few millimeters long and a pappus about 1.5 centimeters in length.

References

External links
Jepson Manual Treatment

ciliolatum
Flora of California
Flora of Oregon
Plants described in 1900
Flora of North America